Pedro Sánchez de Castro, (fl. 1454–1484) was a Spanish Gothic painter. His dates of birth and death are unknown.

Sánchez de Castro has been identified primarily through his works. He lived and worked all his life in his native Seville. He painted religious themed works for local churches.

He died in Sevilla. A surviving triptych was at the Metropolitan Museum of Art, but was auctioned off in 2013 to a private collector.

References

15th-century Spanish painters
Spanish male painters
1440s births
1480s deaths
People from Seville